The Sydney Cricket and Sports Ground Trust (popularly known as the Sydney Cricket Ground Trust or SCG Trust) was an agency of the Government of New South Wales that operated the Sydney Cricket Ground and Sydney Football Stadium in Sydney, New South Wales, Australia. It was merged into Venues NSW on 1 December 2020.

The SCG Trust operated the Sydney Cricket Ground (SCG) and New Sydney Football Stadium (SFS) at Moore Park in Sydney. In mid-2008, its head office The Sheridan Building opened, making it the third building to erect in the Gold Members Car Park, alongside the headquarters of Sydney City Roosters and New South Wales Rugby Union. Soon after it opened, Sydney Swans and Sydney FC relocated their headquarters inside the Sheridan Building. There are four clubs from four sports codes with their headquarters at the ground.

In 2007 the UTS-Balmain club formed a partnership with the Sydney Cricket Ground Trust and are now known as Sydney CC or Sydney Cricket Club or just simply Sydney Tigers.

Statues

The Trust has commissioned ten bronze sculpture statues to be placed around the grounds of the SCG and SFS.

Media Hall of Honour
In 2014 the Sydney Cricket and Sports Ground Trust opened the Media Hall of Honour at the MA Noble Stand's media centre with fifteen inaugural inductees:

Richie Benaud
Ernet Black
Ernie Christensen
John Davis
Jack Fingleton

Ian Heads
Frank Hyde
Norman May
Alan McGilvray
Johnnie Moyes

John O'Gready
Bill O'Reilly
Ray Robinson
Jim Shepherd
Ray Warren

See also

References

External links

 Business Events Sydney - Responsible for promoting the Sydney Cricket Ground Trust & its properties as world class events destinations.

Sydney Cricket Ground
Event management companies of Australia
Hospitality companies of Australia
Sports organisations of Australia